Eijsden railway station (Edn) is the railway station of Eijsden, Limburg, the Netherlands. The station, which is the southernmost railway station in the Netherlands, opened on 24 November 1861, and was closed between 10 December 2006 and 11 December 2011.

The railway station is located on the railway line between Liège-Guillemins (Belgium) and Maastricht (Netherlands). Only trains of the National Railway Company of Belgium between the two stations call in Eijsden; Nederlandse Spoorwegen trains don't serve the station.

When the National Railway Company of Belgium extended the InterCity line between Brussels-South and Liège-Guillemins to Maastricht, the regular local service between Liège-Guillemins and Maastricht was halted. The InterCity trains were too long to halt in Eijsden, so the railway station was closed. A new busline was opened between Maastricht and the railway station in Visé (Belgium) to serve Eijsden.

After the closure of the railway station, citizens of Eijsden formed the committee "Trein Terug In Eijsden" (Return the Train To Eijsden), which aims to reopen the railway station. Overhead lines at the station carry 3 kV direct current, like the Belgian railway network, whereas the Dutch railway network carries 1.5 kV. Regular Dutch electric trains are not able to reach Eijsden unless they are multi-system units.

As of 11 December 2011 Eijsden is again being served by Belgian trains, thus reopening the station after a 5-year closure.

Train services
The station is served by the following service(s):

1x per hour Local services (stoptrein) Hasselt - Liers - Liège - Visè - Maastricht (weekdays)
1x per hour Local services (stoptrein) Liège - Visè - Maastricht (weekends)

Railway stations opened in 1861
Railway stations closed in 2006
Railway stations in Limburg (Netherlands)
Defunct railway stations in the Netherlands
1861 establishments in the Netherlands
Eijsden-Margraten
Railway stations in the Netherlands opened in the 19th century